Mazdakism was an Iranian religion, which was an offshoot of Zoroastrianism. The religion has been called one of the most noteworthy examples of pre-modern communism.

The religion was founded in the early Sasanian Empire by Zardusht, a Zoroastrian mobad who was a contemporary of Mani (d. 274). However, it is named after its most prominent advocate, Mazdak, who was a powerful and controversial figure during the reign of Emperor Kavad I.

Theology 
Mazdakism was a dualistic religion that appeared to be influenced by Manichaeism. It taught that there were two principles, light and dark (good and evil) that merged at a primordial time creating the universe. The Mazdakites worshipped the God of Light.

Ethics 
Mazdakism strongly promoted simple and pacifist living. Acts such as murder and killing animals for food or sport were forbidden, as was eating meat. Followers were to treat all people, even their enemies kindly. The movement also believed in the holding of all things in common to reduce greed and, allegedly, promoted group marriage or polyandry, the latter if true presumably due to the lack of women for poor men to marry due to the polygyny of the upper classes of Iranian society at the time.

Citations

Cited sources

General sources 
 
 
 
 

Iranian religions
Religion in Iran
Religion in the Sasanian Empire
Religions that require vegetarianism
Zoroastrianism